Emperor Cheng may refer to:

Emperor Cheng of Han (51–7 BC) 
Emperor Cheng of Jin (321–342)